The Women's Flat Track Derby Association Division 1 (WFTDA Division 1) is the highest level of play in women's flat track roller derby.

Organisation
The division consists of the 36 highest-ranked members of the Women's Flat Track Derby Association, based on performance over the previous year, who compete across three Playoff tournaments with 12 teams at each Playoff.

Historically, the WFTDA instead operated four regions: East, North Central, South Central and West.  At the start of 2013, these were redivided into three divisions, each operating worldwide.  However, foreseeing continued growth in membership, the WFTDA stated that future developments were likely to include new regional structures alongside the divisional system. Through 2016, under the original divisional system, Division 1 comprised the top 40 eligible teams, with the next 20 eligible teams qualifying for Division 2 Playoffs.

Teams in Division 1 play in bouts through the year, aiming to qualify for one of the three Division 1 Playoffs. Starting with 2015, sanctioned-game play requirements were modified to be simply any 4 WFTDA-sanctioned games played between December 1 of the previous calendar year and June 30, without a requirement to play a certain number of games against similarly-ranked opponents. Teams which do not play a minimum number of sanctioned bouts are not permitted to compete at the Playoffs. The next 16-ranked teams as of June of the calendar year remain eligible for Division 2 Playoffs.

Member leagues

The 2017 Division 1 member list was announced by the WFTDA on July 14. Two teams that were in the top 36 on June 30 - #23 Adelaide Roller Derby of Adelaide, Australia, and #26 Team United Women's Roller Derby of Des Moines, Iowa - did not meet gameplay requirements to qualify for WFTDA Playoffs. Two eligible leagues, #31 Rocky Mountain Rollergirls of Denver, Colorado and #33 Blue Ridge Rollergirls of Asheville, North Carolina both declined, and this allowed teams as low as #40 Wasatch Roller Derby to participate. As a result, the table below features 38 teams, including the two that declined participating in the 2017 Division 1 Playoffs.

Notes

Past members
The initial Division 1 membership list for 2013 was based upon the team's rankings as of June 30, 2012. The 2014 Division 1 membership list was announced on 9 December 2013, based on the overall rankings that took effect as of 30 November 2013. The same methodology was employed in 2014, and membership of Division 1 that year mostly comprised teams from the United States, but also Australia, Canada and the United Kingdom. Eight teams which were original members dropped out of Division 1 membership at the conclusion of the 2013 WFTDA season. Since then, additional teams have dropped out of Division 1.

Starting in 2015, division assignments were announced based on June 30 rankings, and in-division gameplay requirements were removed. As the annual June 30 rankings now determines Playoff position, and as the divisional definition is only used for playoff assignments, the rankings as of June 30, 2016 determine Division 1 membership. Membership includes all teams that are eligible for Division 1 Playoffs, even if a team declines their invitation to Playoffs, as well as teams ranked beyond the usual Division 1 cutoff who are invited due to higher-ranked teams not competing. Teams that do not meet minimum gameplay requirements are ineligible to receive a Playoffs invitation and therefore not included as Division 1 members. In 2016 Division 1 also included members from Finland and Sweden.

Notes

Division 1 Playoffs
Prior to 2015, teams in Division 1 played in bouts through the year, aiming to qualify for one of the four Division 1 Playoffs. Each Playoff includes ten teams. However, Division 1 teams are not guaranteed a playoff spot, as teams in lower divisions can qualify by being ranked among the top forty WFTDA members. Additionally, teams which do not play a minimum number of sanctioned bouts are not permitted to compete at the Playoffs, with Division 1 teams required to play at least 4 WFTDA-sanctioned bouts following the previous year's championship and the current year's June 30, with at least 3 of those being against other D1 teams.

After 2015, in-division gameplay requirements for playoff consideration were dropped, leaving the June 30 rankings as the sole determinant of division eligibility.

2013 Playoffs
All four of the 2013 Playoffs were played in the United States.  The top three teams from each Playoff qualify for the WFTDA Championships, and the London Rollergirls became the first ever non-U.S. team to achieve this. The Oly Rollers, who on June 30, 2013 were ranked 3rd overall, chose not to compete in the required minimum sanctioned games, with the full knowledge they would miss the WFTDA tournaments as a result. Oly still remains a member of the WFTDA and could have qualified for 2014 WFTDA playoffs if they met their requirements.

2014 Playoffs
All four of the 2014 Playoff tournaments were again played in the United States, and again the top three teams from each tournament qualified for the 2014 WFTDA Championships.

2015 Playoffs
The same format was used for the 2015 Playoffs.

2016 Playoffs
The 2016 Division 1 Playoffs followed the same format as previous years, once again distributing the qualifying teams using an S-curve seeding structure. For the first time, two of the Division 1 tournaments were held outside the United States, both in Canada: the first in Montreal, hosted by Montreal Roller Derby, and the second in Vancouver, hosted by Terminal City Rollergirls. Montreal Roller Derby became the first Canadian team to qualify for the Division 1 Championship by placing third at their own tournament in September.

2017 Playoffs
A new structure was announced for 2017, whereby Division 1 membership was reduced to the top 36 eligible teams, to be spread over three Playoff tournaments with 12 teams each; the top four teams from each playoff will advance to Championships. The 2017 Division 1 Playoffs were held in Seattle, Washington September 1–3, Malmö, Sweden September 8–10, and Dallas, Texas September 22–24, feeding into the 2017 Championships in Philadelphia. The participating teams were announced on July 14, 2017.

References

 
Sports leagues established in 2013
Women's Flat Track Derby Association